The Bethpage Air Show is an annual American air show held each May on Memorial Day weekend. It is staged in the airspace above and off the coast of the Jones Beach State Park in Wantagh, New York, located on Long Island.

The air show is typically headlined by either the United States Navy Blue Angels or United States Air Force Thunderbirds. Due to cuts to the military budget, neither team appeared at the 2013 show, but the Blue Angels appeared at the 2014 show. All branches of the military are represented at the show.

The 2020 was cancelled, due to the global COVID-19 pandemic.

References

External links 
Official website

Air shows in the United States
Airshow
Aviation in New York (state)
Wantagh, New York
Tourist attractions in Nassau County, New York